Alfie Buller (born 12 August 1957) is an Irish equestrian. He competed in the team eventing at the 1996 Summer Olympics.

References

External links
 

1957 births
Living people
Irish male equestrians
Olympic equestrians of Ireland
Equestrians at the 1996 Summer Olympics
Place of birth missing (living people)